The 2008 Falken Tasmania Challenge was the thirteenth and penultimate round of the 2008 V8 Supercar season. It was held on the weekend of the 21–23 November at the Symmons Plains Raceway in Tasmania.

Qualifying 
Qualifying was held on Saturday 22 November 2008.

Race 1
Race 1 was held on Saturday 22 November 2008.

Race 2 
Race 2 was held on Sunday 23 November 2008.

Race 3
Race 3 was held on Sunday 23 November 2008.

Results

Qualifying

Standings
After round 13 of 14.

Support categories
The 2008 Falken Tasmania Challenge had four support categories.

References

External links
Official timing and results

Falken Tasmania Challenge